The Pazflor oil development is an offshore oil development in Angola. It involves Perpetua, Hortensia and Zinia (Upper Miocene), and Acacia (Oligocene) oilfields, which were discovered between mid-2000 and early 2003.

Location

Technical features
The Pazflor oil development will produce heavy crude oil from Miocene reservoirs, and lighter oil from the Acacia Oligocene reservoir. Drilling operations were commenced in 2009 and oil production started on 24 August 2011. The Pazflor FPSO was constructed in South Korea and on the 18 January 2011 it started the  journey to Angola where it was moored and installed. It was towed by three Fairmount Marine's tugs.

Operator
Sonangol is the Block 17 concessionaire. Like other developments in the Block 17, the operator is Total S.A. with interest of 40%, and other partners are Statoil (23.33%), ExxonMobil (20%) and BP (16.67%).

References

Oil fields of Angola